Make It Big is the second and final studio album from British pop duo Wham!, released in 1984. In comparison to their earlier work, Wham! (George Michael and Andrew Ridgeley) had more control over the album's production and Michael would also be credited as a producer. The album was a commercial success, hitting number one in both the US and the UK and spawning four singles, all reaching the top three in the US and the UK.

The music video for single "Wake Me Up Before You Go-Go" had the duo in shirts that read Choose Life. It would be the first of several hits from the album. The second single "Careless Whisper" is technically a Wham! song as it appears on the Wham! album Make It Big. However, when released as a single, it was credited either to Wham! featuring George Michael (in North America and several other countries) or solely to George Michael (in the United Kingdom and some European countries) as it became apparent, that at some point in the near future, Michael would be embarking on a solo career. The music video for third single "Freedom" featured the duo while performing a concert in China; incidentally Wham! would become the first Western popular music act to tour China. The fourth single "Everything She Wants" was released as a double A-side with "Last Christmas"; "Last Christmas" would later appear on Music from the Edge of Heaven, an album released only in North America and Japan.

Make It Big was certified 4× platinum in the US during the time of its release, and has since been certified 6× platinum in the US.

Background and production
The album was mostly written and recorded at Studio Miraval in Southern France over a course of six weeks, beginning in early July 1984. This allowed Michael to escape press attention and work peacefully. According to Andrew Ridgeley, the decision to record in the south of France was made largely due to tax reasons, as well as it being the ideal place for them to spend the summer due to the hot weather. Plus, it was 1 and a half hours away from London, and Michael "had to keep going back to do things for Careless Whisper". Like "Careless Whisper" and "Wake Me Up Before You Go-Go", most of the songs were recorded with a live rhythm section.

The main album credits attribute it as having been mixed at Good Earth Studios in London and Marcadet Studios in Paris. However, it turns out to be neither, as engineer Porter revealed: most of the album was mixed at Sarm West's Studio 2 (where Careless Whisper and Wake Me Up Before You Go Go were recorded), with some mixing already completed at Studio Miraval.

Critical reception
Make It Big, Wham's second album, would see the duo score hit singles in the United States. Their first album Fantastic was a hit in the UK but failed to make an impact in the US. Make it Big received some positive reviews. Christopher Connelly from Rolling Stone wrote that the "music is an unabashed rehash of Motown", adding "Make It Big is an almost flawless pop record, a record that does exactly what it wants to and has a great deal of fun doing it." In a retrospective review Stephen Thomas Erlewine from AllMusic writes, "They succeeded on a grander scale than they ever could have imagined, conquering the world and elsewhere with this effervescent set of giddy new wave pop-soul."

Track listing

Personnel 

Wham!
 George Michael – lead vocals, backing vocals, keyboards (2, 3), LinnDrum (2)
 Andrew Ridgeley – electric guitars, backing vocals

Additional musicians
 Tommy Eyre – keyboards (1, 4–7)
 Andy Richards – keyboards (8)
 Anne Dudley – additional keyboards 
 Tom Herries – additional keyboards
 Hugh Burns – electric guitars, acoustic guitar 
 Deon Estus – bass 
 Trevor Murrell – drums, LinnDrum (1)
 Danny Cummings – percussion
 David Baptiste – alto saxophone
 Steve Gregory – tenor saxophone (8)
 Colin Graham – trumpet
 Paul Spong – trumpet 
 Pepsi & Shirlie – backing vocals

Production 
 George Michael – producer, arrangements 
 Chris Porter – engineer 
 Paul Gomersall – assistant engineer 
 P/S/A – design 
 Tony McGee – photography

Charts

Weekly charts

Year-end charts

Decade-end charts

Certifications and sales

The Big Tour

Wham! embarked on a world tour to promote the album in December 1984, opening at Whitley Bay's Ice Rink, before going on to dates in Japan, Australia, United States, United Kingdom, Hong Kong and China, ending in April 1985 at the Sun Yat-sen Memorial Hall in Canton.

See also
Wham! discography

References

1984 albums
Wham! albums
Columbia Records albums
Epic Records albums
Albums recorded at Studio Miraval